The United Nations Partisan Infantry Korea (UNPIK), was a guerrilla unit during the Korean War that was consolidated under the control of United States Far East Command.

The details of the undercover operation were made public by the US Army in 1990. The unit worked deep inside North Korea to gather intelligence, conduct raids and sabotage, rescue POWs, recruit and lead guerrilla armies and create confusion in the enemy's rear.

History 
 In November 1952: 8240th Army Unit and other guerrilla units were redesignated as United Nations Partisan Forces Korea (UNPFK)
 In September 1953: The name changed to United Nations Partisan Infantry Korea (UNPIK)

UNPIK was disbanded in 1954.

Operations
The island Wollaedo in the Yellow Sea was used as a base by pro-Southern partisans during the war.  This position was regularly bombarded by Northern artillery on the mainland of Cape Changsan. 

In 1952, a group of partisans working together with UNPIK landed on the cape. They successfully took control of and destroyed the artillery site, escaping with small losses.

See also
Korea Liaison Office
8240th Army Unit
Joint Advisory Commission, Korea

Further reading 
 Guerrilla Warfare History of Korean War - Institute for Military History in South Korea Ministry of National Defense 
 Facets of the U.S. Army Guerrilla Commands in Korea - U.S. ARMY SPECIAL OPERATIONS COMMAND HISTORY OFFICE

References

External links
The White Tigers Veterans of Foreign Wars Magazine
8240th Army Unit Association page on the United Nations Partisan Forces Korea (UNPFK) 
Organigramme
List of medals and patches
My Secret War in North Korea, book review
http://www.korean-war.com/specops.html The Korean War, United Nations Special Operations in Korea DEAD LINK

United Nations Partisan Infantry Korea
United States Army units and formations in the Korean War
Special Operations Forces of the United States
International special forces
Korea
Military units and formations established in 1951
Military units and formations disestablished in 1954
1951 establishments in South Korea
Army reconnaissance units and formations
Military units and formations of South Korea in the Korean War
Military units and formations of the United States in the Korean War